The 1982 Southland Conference men's basketball tournament was held March 5–7, 1982 at Blackham Coliseum in Lafayette, Louisiana.

 defeated  in the championship game, 81–75, to win their first Southland men's basketball tournament.

The Ragin' Cajuns received a bid to the 1982 NCAA Tournament as No. 8 seed in the Mideast region. They were the only Southland member invited to the tournament.

Format
Five of seven of the conference's members participated in the tournament field. They were seeded based on regular season conference records, with the top two seeds earning byes into the semifinal round.  and  did not participate.  and  began play in the quarterfinal round.

All games were played at Blackham Coliseum in Lafayette, Louisiana.

Bracket

References

Southland Conference men's basketball tournament
Tournament
Southland Conference men's basketball tournament
Southland Conference men's basketball tournament
Basketball competitions in Louisiana
College sports tournaments in Louisiana
Sports in Lafayette, Louisiana